Pedro Moreno Gonzalez (Lagos de Moreno, Jalisco, Mexico, January 18, 1775 – Guanajuato, October 27, 1817), was an insurgent in the Mexican War of Independence.

Early days
Moreno was born in Hacienda de La Daga, a community in the Mexican city of Villa de Santa María de los Lagos (later renamed Lagos de Moreno in his honor), the son of Manuel Moreno de Ortega y Verdín de Villavicencio and María del Rosario González de Hermosillo y Márquez. He studied in the Guadalajara seminary.

At the end of the 18th century he went back to his home town and became a trader. He married Rita Pérez Jiménez.

Start of the fight 
At his hacienda La Sauceda, he organized the farmers to fight against the Spaniards. His headquarters was Fuerte del Sombrero, where Francisco Javier Mina joined Pedro Moreno's forces. In this fort, they fought until August 15 of 1817 when they had to evacuate the fort because of a Spanish attack.

Once out of the fort, the locations of all their battles were: El Bajío and Los Altos de Jalisco. Pedro Moreno and Francisco Javier Mina went back to the Fuerte del Sombrero.

Final days
The Spaniards again attacked the fort but this time continuously for two months. Without food, provisions, and any hope of help, the revolutionaries had to get out of the fort.

On October 27, while traveling on their escape, they had to stop at the ranch El Venadito, where they were attacked. In this attack Pedro Moreno was killed.

See also
 Statue of Pedro Moreno

References

External links 
 Bicentenary of the start of the Independence War and Centenary of the Mexican Revolution
 Pedro Moreno baptism
 History Archives Information of Lagos de Moreno July-August 2010 No. 79

People of the Mexican War of Independence
1775 births
1817 deaths